This is a list of religious populations by number of adherents and countries.

Adherents in 2020

Notes

By proportion

Christians
Countries and territories with the greatest proportion of Christians from Christianity by country, :

  100% (100% Roman Catholic)
  100% (100% Seventh-day Adventist)
  ~99% (mostly Protestant)
  99.6% (mostly Roman Catholic)
  98.5% (96% Armenian Orthodox Apostolic)
  98.3% (mostly Protestant)
  98.1% (mostly Roman Catholic) 
  98% (71% Roman Catholic)
  98% (95% Greek Orthodox)
  97.2% (mostly Protestant)
  97.2% (mostly Protestant)
  97% (~97% Roman Catholic)
  96.9% (mostly Roman Catholic)
  96.4% (mostly Roman Catholic)
  96% (mostly Protestant)
  ~96% (mostly Protestant)
  95.1% (mostly Protestant)
  94.8% (mostly Protestant)
  94.6% (mostly Roman Catholic)
  94.51% (mostly Roman Catholic)
  93% (mostly Romanian Orthodox)
  92.9% (mostly Roman Catholic)
  91.1% (mostly Roman Catholic)
  90% (mostly Roman Catholic)

Muslims

Countries with a considerable proportion of Muslims from Islam by country , excluding foreign workers in brackets:

Data is based on the Pew Forum on Religion and Public Life

  100%
  100%
  ~100%
  Gaza Strip 99.9%
  99.9%
  99.8% (65% Sunni 33.5% Zaydi 1.5% Ismaili)
  99.7% (90% Sunni 10% Shi'a)
  99.6% (95% Shi'a, 5% Sunni)
  99.5% 
  99.2% (Shi'a)
  99% (67% Shi'a, 33% Sunni)
  99% (mostly Sunni)
  98.6% (85% Sunni, 15% Shi’a)
  98.3%
  98%
  97.2% (90% Sunni, 10% Shi'a)
  97%
  96.9%
  96.6%
  96.4% (85% Sunni 12% Shi'a 3% Other)
  90.4%
  89.3% 
  86.7%
  61.3%
  53.5%
  41%

Irreligious and atheistsCountries with the greatest proportion of people without religion, including agnostics and atheists, from Irreligion by country: 

  (78.4%) 
  (71.3%) 
  (60.2%) 
  (60%) 
  (54.7%) 
  (51.8%) 
  (46.6%) 
  (45.3%) 
  (44.3%) 
  (41.5%) 
  (39.6%) 
  (36.5%)
  (35.5%) 
  (31.9%) 
  (31.2%) 
  (31%) 
  (29.9%)
  (29%)
  (28.6%)
  (28.6%)
  (28%)
  (26.7%)
  (26.3%)
  (23.9%)
  (23.2%)
  (22.8%)
  (20.8%)
  (20%)
  (18.8%)

Data is ranked by mean estimate in parentheses. Irreligious includes agnostic, atheist, secular people, and those having no formal religious adherence. It does not necessarily mean that those of this group don't belong to any religion. Some religions have harmonized with local cultures and can be seen as a cultural background rather than a formal religion. Additionally, the practice of officially associating a family or household with a religion, while not formally practicing the affiliated religion, is common in many countries. Thus, over half of this group is theistic and/or influenced by religious principles, but nonreligious/non-practicing and not true atheists or agnostics. See Spiritual but not religious.

HindusCountries with the greatest proportion of Hindus from Hinduism by country :  81.3%
  79.8%
  48.54%
  27.9%
  25%
  24.8%
  22.3%
  18.2%
  15%
  12.6%
  12%
  9.6%
  8.1%
  6.7%
  6.3%
  5.1%
  3%
  2.1%
  2.0%
  2.2%
  1.7%
 1.7%
 1.5%
  0.7%

BuddhistsCountries with the greatest proportion of Buddhists from Buddhism by country : 96.9%
 93.2%
  80.1%
  74.70%
 69.3%
 66.0%
 55.1%
 36.2% - 66.7%
 35.1%
 33.2%
 22.9%
 19.8%
 18.2% 
 17.3% 
 16.4%
 13.2%
 10.3%

Taoists/Confucians/Chinese traditional religionists
As a spiritual practice, Taoism has made fewer inroads in the West than Buddhism and Hinduism. Despite the popularity of its great classics the I Ching and the Tao Te Ching, the practice of Taoism has not been promulgated in America with much success; these religions are not ubiquitous worldwide in the way that adherents of bigger world religions are, and they remain primarily an ethnic religion. Nonetheless, Taoist ideas and symbols such as Taijitu have become popular throughout the world through Tai Chi Chuan, Qigong, and various martial arts.

  33–80%
  30%
  28%
  13.9%
  8.5%
  2.6%
  0.2–1%
 
  0.01–0.05%
  0.05%

The Chinese traditional religion has 184,000 believers in Latin America, 250,000 believers in Europe, and 839,000 believers in North America .

Ethnic and indigenous religionists
Indigenous statistics come from the U.S. Department of State International Religious Freedom Report (2009), based on the highest estimate of people identified as indigenous or followers of indigenous religions that have been well-defined. Due to the syncretic nature of these religions, the numbers may not reflect the actual number of practitioners.

  32.9%
  30.9%
  29.5%
  35.6%
  25%
  25%
  17.9%
  20%
  15%
  15%
  12%
  10%
  10%
  10%
  10%
  10%
  9%
  9%
  8.5%
  5%

SikhsCountries with the greatest proportion of Sikhs:  2.12%
  1.72%
  1.1%
 0.88%
  0.88%
  0.83%
  0.66%
  0.60%Kuwait To Seek Closure Of "Illegal" Sikh Temple Outlook India. February 3, 2022.
  0.57%
  0.44%

The Sikh homeland is the Punjab state, in India, where Sikhs make up approximately 58% of the population. This is the only place where Sikhs are in the majority. Sikhs have emigrated to countries all over the world – especially to English-speaking and East Asian nations. In doing so they have retained, to an unusually high degree, their distinctive cultural and religious identity.
Sikhs are not ubiquitous worldwide in the way that adherents of larger world religions are, and they remain primarily an ethnic religion. But they can be found in many international cities and have become an especially strong religious presence in the United Kingdom and Canada. Sikhism is also the fastest growing religion in New Zealand and Australia.

Spiritists
  10.3%
  10.2%
  4.8%
  3.6%
  2.7%
  2.2%
  1.9%
  1.5%
  1.4%
  1.3%
  1.1%
  1.0%
  1.0%
  0.9%
  0.7%
  0.5%
  0.5%
  0.4%
  0.2%
  0.2%

Spiritist estimates come from a single source, which gives a relative indication of the size of the Spiritist communities within each country.

JewsCountries with the greatest proportion of Jews:  73.6%
  2.0%
  1.76%
  1.07%
  0.7%
  0.485%
  0.483%
  0.47%
  0.44%
  0.41%
  0.36%
  0.259%
  0.250%
  0.24%
  0.22%
  0.17%
  0.16%
  0.154%
  0.154%
  0.152%
  0.14%
  0.124%
  0.124%
  0.122%
  0.112%

Jains

  0.3%
  0.3%
  0.2%
  0.2%
  0.1%

By population
ChristiansLargest Christian populations:
  229,157,250 (details)
  169,213,130
  114,198,444
  106,204,560
  80,510,000
  78,790,000
  67,070,000
  63,150,000
  55,832,000
  51,477,950
  50,752,580
  44,502,000
  41,973,000
  40,243,000
  39,560,000
  38,568,000
  36,526,000
  33,625,790
  33,497,100
  33,200,417
  29,943,000
  28.571.606
  28,436,000
  28,340,790
  27,365,100

 Muslims Largest Muslim populations (as of 2017):
  229,000,000 (details)
      215,000,000
         209,000,000
    153,000,000
       117,000,000
         87,500,000
          82,000,000
   79,850,000
  48,000,000
         44,000,000
          41,000,000
   39,000,000
   38,000,000
   37,000,000
  33,000,000
  33,648,090
         30,000,000
         28,000,000
  25,000,000
         22,000,000
  22,000,000

HindusLargest Hindu populations (as of 2020):
  1,120,000,000
  28,600,000
  14,274,430
  4,640,000
  4,400,000
  3,090,000
  2,510,000
  1,940,000
  1,239,610
  1,030,000
  749,870
  665,820
  890,000
  610,000
  540,000
  440,000
  410,000
  403,570
  380,000
  360,000
  330,000
  310,000
  270,000
  200,000
  200,000
  190,000
  120,785
  120,000

BuddhistsLargest Buddhist populations  244,130,000
  64,420,000
 45,820,000
  38,410,000
 14,450,000
 14,380,000
 13,690,000
 11,050,000
  9,250,000
 5,010,000
 3,800,023
 2,062,000

SikhsLargest Sikh populations  24,000,000 - 28,000,000 
  771,790
 524,000
  ~500,000 
  210,397
   150,000
   120,000
  52,000
  50,000
  40,908
   40,000
  35,540
  26,000
  15,000
  15,000
  15,000
  13,280
  12,000
  10,000
  10,000

JewsLargest Jewish populations:
  6,451,000
  5,700,000
  456,000
  390,000
  289,500
  180,500
  176,000
  116,500
  113,200
  93,800
  69,300
  53,000
  47,500
  40,000
  29,800
  29,300
  27,300
  18,700
  18,300
  16,900
  15,300
  15,000
  11,800
  10,000
  10,000

BaháʼísLargest Baháʼí populations in countries with a national population ≥200,000:
   1,897,651
   512,864
  422,782
  388,802
  282,916
  275,069
  251,127
  241,112
  238,532
  215,359
  190,419
  169,811
  95,098
  94,499
  87,259
  78,915
  70,504
  67,549
  65,096
  59,898

Jains
:

  5,146,697
  79,459
  68,848
  35,000
  12,101
  9,002
  6,800
  2,663
  2,398
  2,052
  1,918
  1,573
  1,535
  1,500
  1,449
  1,217
  1,000
  981
  500 families
  229

See also
 Major religious groups
 World religions
 Importance of religion by countryReligions:'''
 Religions by country
 History of the Baháʼí Faith
 Buddhism by country
 Christianity by country
 Catholic Church by country
 Protestantism by country
 Eastern Orthodoxy by country
 Oriental Orthodoxy by country
 Hinduism by country
 Islam by country
 Ahmadiyya by country
 Judaism by country
 Sikhism by country

References

External links
 Asian-Nation: Religious Affiliation among Asian Americans
 International Religious Freedom Report 2007 of U.S. Department of State
 Background Notes of U.S. Department of State
 The World Factbook of CIA
 Religious Freedom page
 Religious Intelligence
 BBC News – Muslims in Europe: Country guide
 Vipassana Foundation – Buddhists around the world

Populations
Religion by country